Alexandru Ionuț Neacșa (born 3 September 1991) is a Romanian footballer who plays as a midfielder for Corvinul Hunedoara.

Honours

Club
Viitorul Șelimbăr
Liga III: 2020–21

References

External links

1991 births
Living people
People from Drăgășani
Romanian footballers
Association football midfielders
Liga I players
CS Turnu Severin players
CSM Corona Brașov footballers
CS Universitatea Craiova players
FC Viitorul Constanța players
Liga II players
CS Gaz Metan Mediaș players
FC Hermannstadt players
CS Luceafărul Oradea players
ACS Viitorul Târgu Jiu players
CSC 1599 Șelimbăr players
Belarusian Premier League players
FC Dinamo Minsk players
Liga III players
CS Corvinul Hunedoara players
Romanian expatriate footballers
Romanian expatriate sportspeople in Belarus
Expatriate footballers in Belarus